The Centre For Electronics Design And Technology or CEDT is one of the departments under the division of Electrical Sciences in Indian Institute of Science. It was established in 1974. In 2011, it was renamed as Department of Electronic Systems and Engineering (DESE).

History

CEDT was established in 1974 with the support from Indian and Swiss Governments under "Indo Swiss Agreement on Technical and Scientific Co-operation signed on 27th September 1966". Prof. Arvind Victor Shah  and Prof. BS Sonde were the founding chairs.  :. Now it is renamed as DESE, Department of Electronic System Engineering.

Academics
The center offers following Master level programs, apart from the research program leading to a PhD.
 Master in Technology (M.Tech) in Electronics Design & Technology (EDT)
 Master in Engineering (M.E.) in Microelectronics
 Master of Science (M.Sc.Eng.)

Admission
M.Tech.: candidates are shortlisted based on the GATE score. Then the admission is based on the written test & the interview conducted by CEDT faculty.

M.Sc (By Research): candidates are shortlisted based on the GATE score. Then the admission is based on the interview conducted by CEDT faculty. The interview is conducted according to the candidates' area of interest.

Research
 Power Electronics
 Communication Networks
 Very Large Scale Integration (VLSI) Circuits & Systems
 Nanoelectronics
 Electronics Packaging
 Electromagnetic Compatibility
 Embedded Systems
 Electro-Mechanics Lab

Location

CEDT is located in the eastern part of the IISc campus behind Mathematics department. The other nearby departments are:
Combustion, Gasification and Propulsion Laboratory
Center for Oceanic & Atmospheric Sciences

Product design
The course structure is designed to inculcate system level understanding among the students. Most of the M.Tech. projects are sponsored by companies and result in hardware electronic products. Some of the students later transform their knowledge into commercial ventures like Gamma Porite.

Student life
M.Tech. and M.E. students mostly remain busy with course work in first two semesters and with the thesis/project work the remaining two semesters. M.S students have to take a fewer courses and get more time to work on their thesis.

There are different clubs and societies under the student council on campus which serve for various extra curricular activities. These associations fall under the IISc Gymkhana. List of the various active clubs are:
 Yoga Club
 Hockey Club
 Movie Club
 Drama Club
 Music Club
 Swimming Club
 Kung-Fu Club
 Cricket
 Football
 Athletics
 Lawn Tennis
 Literary and Fine Arts
 Photography

Events

CEDT Design Expo 
The CEDT Design Expo  is the design exposition organised by the center every year in the month of June. In the expo, the M.Tech students display the product designed by them as part of the two-year master's program. The display normally has a live demonstration of the product followed by discussions. The event is attended by various experts from the industry. The event is open to all.

Panorama 
Panorama is an annual event where the students working towards their PhD and M.S. degrees present their research work.

Potluck 
Potluck is an annual get together function of CEDT. It is usually organized in the month of October by first year students of different programs. It is a two-day event. Generally, there are sports events and cultural activities on both the days along with alumni meet, etc. Actual potluck is on the evening of second day.

References

Research institutes in Bangalore
Multidisciplinary research institutes
Research institutes established in 1974
1974 establishments in Karnataka